Michela Pezzetti (born 27 January 1991) is an Italian karateka, four times European champion at senior level at the European Karate Championships.

References

External links
 

1991 births
Living people
Italian female karateka
Karateka of Fiamme Oro
20th-century Italian women
21st-century Italian women